Weilimdorf until 1955 known as "Weil im Dorf," is the north-western borough (Stadtbezirk) of the German city and capital of Baden-Württemberg, Stuttgart. Weilimdorf became part of Stuttgart in 1933 amidst the hardship of the economic instability of the 30s in Germany. The city district is made up by six Stadtteile: Weilimdorf (with more than 50% of the population), Bergheim, Giebel, Hausen, Weilimdorf-Nord and Wolfbusch and is home to an expanding commercial area.

Notable architecture includes Castle Solitude, the 15th Century Oswald Church and the Löwen-Markt, the modern center of Weilimdorf.

Geography
The district covers an area of exactly . Of this area, 29.4% of it is occupied by construction, another 12.3% is used by transportation, 3.9% is devoted to parks, forests stand on another 28.2%, and finally, agriculture occupies the final 28.7%.

References

Districts of Stuttgart